This is a list of episodes from the British television series Benidorm.

Series overview

Episodes

Series 1 (2007)

Series 2 (2008)

Summer Special (2009)

Series 3 (2009)

Christmas Special (2010)

Series 4 (2011)

Series 5 (2012)

Series 6 (2014) 
The filming of the sixth series took place between March and June 2013. The series started broadcasting on ITV from 2 January 2014 and finished on 13 February 2014. All main characters from series 5 returned except for Hugh Sachs, Elsie Kelly, Shelley Longworth and Michelle Butterly. Series 6 also saw the introduction of a new family, the Dykes. They consisted of Clive (Perry Benson) Tonya (Hannah Waddingham) Tiger (Danny Walters) and Bianca (Bel Powley). Martin also returned for 2 episodes for his friend's stag do.

Series 7 (2015) 
After the sixth series had aired, ITV confirmed that a seventh series will air in 2015. On 21 March 2014, it was announced that Elsie Kelly, Crissy Rock and Johnny Vegas would return during the series. All main characters from series 6 returned except for Kenny Ireland, Hannah Waddingham and Bel Powley. Filming for the seventh series began on 24 March 2014. Kenny Ireland, who played Donald, wasn't in this series. His character was written out because the actor had developed cancer. He died in July of the same year and the final episode was dedicated to him. All ratings do not include HD as it isn't available for all the episodes. It was also confirmed that the Garveys will leave during series seven.
The seven-part seventh series began on ITV on 2 January 2015 at 9pm and finished on 13 February 2015.

Series 8 (2016) 
A 7-episode eighth series was ordered on 6 February 2015. All episodes were written by Derren Litten. On 26 March 2015 it was announced that Series 8 will introduce a new family, the Dawsons. Julie Graham, Steve Edge, Bobby Knutt, Josh Bolt and Honor Kneafsey had been cast as Sheron Dawson, Billy Dawson, Eddie Dawson, Rob Dawson and Jodie Dawson, respectively. Series 8 also introduced Jessica Ellerby and Nathan Bryon as Amber Platt and Joey Ellis. Filming began on 23 March 2015 and ended on 25 June 2015. It began airing on 11 January 2016 and finished on 22 February 2016.

Series 9 (2017)
The show was renewed for a ninth series on 22 February 2016 and filming took place between 14 March 2016 and 14 July 2016. Series 9 premiered on 1 March 2017 and ended on 3 May 2017. It consists of nine episodes, an increase on the previous series. All main cast members from series 8 returned, except for Jessica Ellerby. Shelley Longworth makes her return as Sam Wood, after her last appearance in series 5. Adam Gillen returns as a regular, following Liam's return in the series 8 finale. Tim Healy was hospitalised during filming, with Les/Lesley only appearing in the first four episodes.

10th Anniversary Documentary (2018)

Series 10 (2018)
A tenth series was commissioned. Filming began on 13 March 2017 and ended on 12 July 2017. The first episode was directed by David Sant. Derren Litten will make his directorial debut in the final two episodes of the series. The series began airing on 28 February 2018 on ITV at 9pm, one week after a documentary titled Benidorm: 10 Years on Holiday. This documentary show cast, past and present talking about their experience on the show and includes footage of the 10th series being filmed. This documentary aired on the 20 February 2018.

All main cast members from series nine will return, except for Danny Walters, Paul Bazely, Johnny Vegas and Honor Kneafsey. Shane Richie, who last appeared in series 8, will make his return as Sammy Valentino for four episodes. John Challis will become a series regular, after making on-off appearances for the last few series as Monty Staines. Tim Healy will return full-time as transvestite Les Conroy.
This series will also feature an array of guest stars including children's TV comedy duo The Chuckle Brothers, legendary comedian Bobby Ball and singers Holly Johnson, Carol Decker and Tony Hadley. Plus another comic duo, Hale and Pace will star as undercover detectives investigating Lesley as well as actors Claire Sweeney as Maxine a snooty holiday rep and Nigel Havers returning as conman dentist Stanley. Young comedy star Layton Williams will also appear in the series in episode 9. Another notable appearance is that of Mark Heap, returning as "Malcolm" the oddball mystery ex of Pauline and Kenneth.

Ratings

References

Benidorm
Benidorm (TV series)